The 2016 Coupe de France Final decided the winner of the 2015–16 Coupe de France, the 99th season of France's all-main-divisions football cup. It took place on 21 May at the Stade de France in Saint-Denis, Paris.

In the final, Olympique de Marseille took on arch-rivals Paris Saint-Germain, in a rematch of the 2006 final, which PSG won 2–1. PSG were the defending champions, having beaten Auxerre in the 2015 Coupe de France Final. As PSG had won the 2015–16 Ligue 1 title already, the otherwise-enabled Europa League place went to the next highest league finisher (in this case, Saint-Étienne).

PSG equalled Marseille's record ten Coupe de France victories with their win.

Background
The match was OM's 19th final (a record), of which they had won 10. Their most recent final was in 2007, which they lost on penalties to Sochaux. PSG had won 9 Coupe de France titles from 13 finals prior to this year's showpiece.

This was Zlatan Ibrahimović's last game for Paris Saint-Germain before moving to Manchester United.

Route to the final

Match

Details

See also
Le Classique

References

Coupe De France Final 2016
Coupe de France Final 2016
Final
2016
Coupe de France Final
Sport in Saint-Denis, Seine-Saint-Denis
Coupe de France Final